
Gmina Górno is a rural gmina (administrative district) in Kielce County, Świętokrzyskie Voivodeship, in south-central Poland.

The gmina contains part of the protected area called Cisów-Orłowiny Landscape Park.

Villages
Gmina Górno contains the villages and settlements of Bęczków, Cedzyna, Górno, Górno-Parcele, Krajno Drugie, Krajno Pierwsze, Krajno-Parcele, Krajno-Zagórze, Leszczyny, Podmąchocice, Radlin, Skorzeszyce and Wola Jachowa.

Neighbouring gminas
Gmina Górno is bordered by the city of Kielce and by the gminas of Bieliny, Bodzentyn, Daleszyce and Masłów.

References
Polish official population figures 2006

Gorno
Kielce County